Aporhytisma is a monotypic genus of fungi within the Diaporthaceae family. It contains the sole species Aporhytisma urticae.

External links

Diaporthales
Monotypic Sordariomycetes genera